Charaxes nicati is a butterfly in the family Nymphalidae. It is found on the Comoros.

Taxonomy
Charaxes varanes group. Subgenus Stonehamia (Hadrodontes).

The group members are:
Charaxes varanes
Charaxes fulvescens very similar to varanes
Charaxes acuminatus very pointed forewing
Charaxes balfouri
Charaxes analava
Charaxes nicati
Charaxes bertrami perhaps subspecies of varanes
Charaxes saperanus
Charaxes defulvata

References

External links
Charaxes nicati images at Consortium for the Barcode of Life

Butterflies described in 1991
nicati
Endemic fauna of the Comoros